Jared Ryker Woodfill V is a Texas lawyer and political figure who was chairman of the Harris County Republican Party from 2002 to 2014. He was elected chairman of the county party for six two-year terms. After being ousted from the chairmanship of the county party in 2014, Woodfill launched two unsuccessful campaigns for the chairmanship of the Texas Republican Party. Woodfill is known for his socially conservative views activism, including his opposition to the Houston Equal Rights Ordinance, which was repealed in a 2015 referendum.

Early life and education
Woodfill graduated from Clear Lake High School, the University of Texas at Austin, and St. Mary's University School of Law.

Legal career
Woodfill was formerly affiliated with the firm Woodfill and Pressler, LLP, in partnership with Paul Pressler, a former state judge. Woodfill represented Pressler in a suit alleging inappropriate sexual conduct; the case settled in 2004 for $450,000.

In September 2018, the State Bar of Texas publicly reprimanded Woodfill and ordered him to pay $3,490 in fees and expenses. The Bar determined that "Woodfill had direct supervisory authority over members of his firm who violated the disciplinary rules during the representation in a divorce, and Woodfill failed to take reasonable action."

Republican Party politics

Harris County Republican Party chairman, 2002 to 2014
Woodfill was the chairman of the Harris County Republican Party from 2002 to 2014. During his twelve years as chair, Woodfill focused on socially conservative causes; this emphasis, as well as Woodfill's management style, was controversial within the county party. Woodfill ran unopposed for reelection until 2010, when he was challenged by three others in an election focusing on allegations of fiscal mismanagement and "a blame game" over Republican losses in Harris County in the 2008 elections. Woodfill won reelection in 2010, but four years later was ousted from the chairmanship by engineer-turned-lawyer Paul Simpson, who heavily outspent Woodfill. Woodfill was endorsed by many Texas Republicans on the right wing, including Dan Patrick.

Subsequent activities

Anti-LGBT rights activism
In 2015, Woodfill was a leading opponent of the Houston Equal Rights Ordinance (HERO) championed by Houston Mayor Annise Parker. The antidiscrimination ordinance prohibited "discrimination in city employment and city services, city contracts, public accommodations, private employment, and housing based on an individual's sex, race, color, ethnicity, national origin, age, familial status, marital status, military status, religion, disability, sexual orientation, genetic information, gender identity, or pregnancy." Woodfill opposed the prohibition against LGBT discrimination and worked to get a proposition challenging the ordinance onto the ballot; in November 2015, Houston voters repealed the ordinance; Parker said that the campaign against the ordinance was based on "fear-mongering and deliberate lies."

In 2017, as editor-in-chief of the group Conservative Republicans of Texas, Woodfill endorsed State Senator Lois Kolkhorst's "bathroom bill" and criticized Joe Straus, the Republican Speaker of the Texas House of Representatives, for not advancing the legislation.

In 2019, Woodfill represented two plaintiffs who filed an unsuccessful lawsuit seeking to block the City of Houston from extending spousal benefits to the same-sex spouses of city employees.

Unsuccessful campaign for Texas Republican Party chairmanship
In 2015, after Texas Republican Party chairman Steve Munisteri stepped down, Woodfill unsuccessfully sought to fill the vacancy. In secret balloting among 62 party officials in March 2015, Tom Mechler of Amarillo, an oil and gas consultant, decisively won on the second ballot, defeating Dallas County Republican Party chair Wade Emmert by one vote; Woodfill came in third place, and Republican National Committeeman Robin Armstrong in last place. In 2016, Woodfill unsuccessfully challenged Mechler in a rematch for a full term as chairman of the Texas Republican Party; Woodfill ran a far-right campaign, with Steven Hotze as one of his leading supporters. During the campaign, Woodfill criticized Mechler as being insufficiently vocal on conservative issues, while Mechler criticized Woodfill's tenure at the head of the Harris County party organization and said Woodfill, if elected, would institute "purity tests" that would damage Republicans and help Democrats. Woodfill withdrew at the state party convention after Republican delegates from 27 of the 31 state Senate districts supported Mechler's retention; Woodfill declared his own backing of Mechler, who was declared elected by a unanimous vote.

2020 election lawsuit
During the 2020 election, Woodfill represented Republican and conservative activists who sued Harris County, Texas, in an attempt to block the use of drive-through voting in Harris County. Woodfill also represented Republican officials and activists (including Hotze, Texas Republican Party chair Allen West, and Agriculture Commissioner Sid Miller) in an attempt to block Governor Greg Abbott's extension of the early voting period. Both measures were adopted due to the COVID-19 pandemic and the Postal Service crisis, and were aimed at increasing voter turnout. Woodfill's bid to invalidate 127,000 votes cast through drive-through voting was rejected by both the Texas Supreme Court and the federal courts. Woodfill described the suit as an attempt to prevent Donald Trump from losing Texas, which he said would occur if "Harris County goes against Trump in large enough numbers." Woodfill subsequently supported legislation by Texas Republican legislators to ban drive-through voting.

Anti-vaccine litigation
In 2021, Woodfill filed an anti-vaccination lawsuit on behalf of a group of employees of Houston Methodist Hospital who refused to receive the COVID-19 vaccine, as required by the hospital. Of Houston Methodist's 26,000 staffers, 99% had received the vaccine, but 178 employees (including some receptionists, technicians, administrative workers, and nurses) refused and were suspended without pay as a result; of these, 117 employees represented by Woodfill sued the hospital system. The plaintiffs' complaint falsely characterized the COVID-19 vaccines as "experimental" and mRNA vaccines as "gene modification"; in fact, the COVID-19 vaccines are safe and effective, received emergency use authorization from the U.S. Food and Drug Administration, and do not modify genes. Woodfill's lawsuit was dismissed; in rejecting the suit, U.S. District Judge Lynn Hughes wrote that the plaintiffs' claim that the COVID-19 vaccines were "experimental and dangerous" was false and  irrelevant and that the plaintiffs' comparison of the hospital's vaccine requirement to Nazi human experimentation during the Holocaust was "reprehensible."

References

External links
Woodfill Law Firm official website

Living people
People from Houston
Texas Republicans
Clear Lake High School (Houston, Texas) alumni
University of Texas at Austin alumni
St. Mary's University School of Law alumni
Texas lawyers
Year of birth missing (living people)